Hisataka (written: 久高) is a Japanese surname. Notable people with the surname include:

, Japanese boxer
, Japanese karateka
, Japanese karateka

Hisataka (written: 久孝 or 久敬) is also a masculine Japanese given name. Notable people with the name include:

, Japanese footballer
, Japanese footballer

Japanese-language surnames
Japanese masculine given names